Cedar Valley High School is a public high school in Eagle Mountain, Utah, United States. It serves students in grades 9-12 for the Alpine School District.

History 
Construction for the high school began in 2017, following the passage of a $387 million bond by voters in Alpine School District. The name Cedar Valley was decided in 2018, among a number of names. The school cost $68.2 million to build.

Cedar Valley opened in the fall of 2019.

Athletics 
Cedar Valley participates in sports sanctioned by the Utah High School Activities Association. The school's nickname is the Aviators. The school competes in Region 10 of class 5A and the colors are crimson red and black. The following sports are offered:

Baseball (boys)
Basketball (girls & boys)
Cross Country (girls & boys)
Football (boys)
Marching Band
Soccer (girls & boys)
Softball (girls)
Tennis (girls & boys)
Track & Field (girls & boys)
Volleyball (girls)
Wrestling (co-ed)
Swim (girls & boys)

See also 
 List of high schools in Utah

References

External links
 

2019 establishments in Utah
Educational institutions established in 2019
Public high schools in Utah
Schools in Utah County, Utah